The Saint Rose Golden Knights are the athletic teams that represent the College of Saint Rose, located in Albany, New York, in NCAA Division II intercollegiate sports.

The Golden Knights are full members of the Northeast-10 Conference, which is home to all nineteen of its athletic programs. Saint Rose has been a member of the Northeast-10 since 2000.

Varsity teams

List of teams

Men's sports (9)
 Baseball
 Basketball
 Cross Country
 Esports
 Golf
 Lacrosse
 Soccer
 Swimming and diving
 Track and field

Women's sports (10)
 Basketball
 Cross country
 Esports
 Golf
 Lacrosse
 Soccer
 Softball
 Swimming and diving
 Track and field
 Volleyball

National championships

Team

References

External links
 

College of Saint Rose
College sports teams in New York (state)
NCAA Division II teams